Joseph Atwell, D.D. (12 April 1696, in Buckland Monachorum – 11 August 1768, in Oxford) was an Oxford college head in the 18th century.

Atwell was educated at Exeter College, Oxford and became a Fellow in 1718. He was Rector  from 1733 until 1737. An ordained Anglican priest, he held the livings at Oddington and Fairford.

References

Alumni of Exeter College, Oxford
Rectors of Exeter College, Oxford
Fellows of Exeter College, Oxford
1696 births
1768 deaths
18th-century English Anglican priests
Clergy from Devon